Carol Platt Liebau is president of the Yankee Institute for Public Policy. She is also an attorney, political analyst, and conservative commentator. Her book Prude: How the Sex-Obsessed Culture Damages Girls (and America, Too!) was published in 2007.

Education 
A native of St. Louis, Missouri, Liebau attended Princeton University and later attended Harvard Law School where she was managing editor of the Harvard Law Review.

Personal life 
She lives in the New York metropolitan area, with her husband, Jack.

References

External links 
 Personal website

Living people
Princeton School of Public and International Affairs alumni
Harvard Law School alumni
Lawyers from St. Louis
Year of birth missing (living people)